Sakito Maru was a 7,126-ton Japanese  troop transport that operated during World War II. She was sunk on 1 March 1944 with great loss of life.

Construction
Sakito Maru was built in 1939 by the Mitsubishi Zosen Kaisha in Nagasaki for the Nippon Yusen shipping company. She was the lead ship of  seven ships of the Sakito Maru-class of high speed transports: Sakito Maru (崎戸丸), Sanuki Maru (讃岐丸), Sado Maru (佐渡丸), Sagami Maru (相模丸), Sagara Maru (相良丸), Sasako Maru (笹子丸), and Sakura Maru (佐倉丸).

Early service
On 4 September 1940 on a foggy morning, SAKITO MARU collides with 1,514-ton fishing barge "Olympic II" that is anchored on “Horseshoe Kelp” fishing bank at the entrance of Los Angeles Harbor. "Olympic II" sinks in 100 feet of water. Seven or eight persons aboard her are killed. On 24 September 1941 she tows "Arima Maru", that had run four miles south of Mollendo harbor, Peru on 25 May, to Callao, Peru after being refloated. Temporary repairs are made then she tows Arima Maru to Yokohama, Japan for permanent repairs departing 9 October and arriving on 20 November, 1941.

Aleutians Islands campaign
After the beginning of World War II, Sakito Maru was converted into a troop transport. She and the merchant cruiser Asaka Maru were operating as  transports, carrying reinforcements to the Japanese garrison of Attu in the Aleutian Islands during the Aleutian Islands campaign, when their convoy encountered the warships of United States Navy Task Group 16.6 in the North Pacific Ocean near the Komandorski Islands on 27 March 1943. Sakito Maru and Asaka Maru steamed away and avoided combat in the ensuing Battle of the Komandorski Islands. Two U.S. Navy PBY Catalina flying boats sighted the two transports during the afternoon, but land-based United States Army Air Forces airstrikes launched against them during the afternoon failed to find them. They returned safely to Paramushiro in the Kuril Islands, but failed to deliver the reinforcements to Attu.

Loss
On 29 February 1944, Sakito Maru was carrying the Imperial Japanese Army′s 18th Infantry Regiment as part of Convoy Matsu-01, which was transporting the 29th Division of the Kwantung Army from Manchukuo to Guam. The submarine badly damaged the large passenger-cargo ship Aki Maru. Two torpedoes also hit Sakito Maru around 17:56 and she caught fire.Asashimo detected Trout and dropped 19 depth charges. Oil and debris came to the surface and the destroyer dropped a final depth charge on that spot, sinking the American submarine with the loss of all hands at the position .

At 04:00 on 1 March 1944, the burning Sakito Maru sank. Of the 3,500 men on board, 2,358 soldiers, 65 ship's gunners, and 52 crewmen died. Also lost were several light tanks and most of the regiment's equipment.

 See also 
 List by death toll of ships sunk by submarines
 List of battles and other violent events by death toll

References
Footnotes

Bibliography
 Morison, Samuel Eliot. History of U.S. Naval Operations in World War II, Volume VII: Aleutians, Gilberts, and Marshalls, June 1942–April 1944''. Boston: Little, Brown and Company, 1984.

Ships of the NYK Line
World War II merchant ships of Japan
Ships of the Aleutian Islands campaign
Ships sunk by American submarines
Maritime incidents in March 1944
Ships built by Mitsubishi Heavy Industries
Troop ships of Japan
World War II shipwrecks in the Pacific Ocean
1938 ships